Vinay Kumar Jha (born 21 June 1971) is a Nepalese cricket umpire. He is one of the umpires on the ICC Associates and Affiliates Umpire Panel chosen by the International Cricket Council (ICC). He stood in matches in the 2009 ICC World Cricket League Division Six tournament and he stood in the 2015–17 ICC World Cricket League Championship fixtures between Nepal and Kenya in March 2017.

On 18 April 2021, he stood in his first Twenty20 International (T20I) as an on-field umpire, in the match between the Netherlands and Malaysia in the 2020–21 Nepal Tri-Nation Series. On 26 March 2022, he stood in his first One Day International (ODI) as an on-field umpire, in the match between Nepal and Papua New Guinea in the 2021–22 Nepal T20I Tri-Nation Series.

See also
 List of One Day International cricket umpires
 List of Twenty20 International cricket umpires

References

External links
 

1971 births
Living people
Nepalese cricket umpires
Nepalese One Day International cricket umpires
Nepalese Twenty20 International cricket umpires
People from Dhanusha District